Amor on Pegasus in Wrocław, Poland, is a monument located in Nicolaus Copernicus Park, within the Old Town Promenade at Teatralna Street. The sculptor was Theodor von Gosen.

Description
This monumental sculpture is set on a high pedestal that is located at the eastern end of the Park, at the back of the former Leipziger Palace. The sculpture presents two mythical figures: Cupid riding on Pegasus, symbolizing love and poetry. Cupid's eyes are made of marble, and Pegasus' of topaz.

History
The unveiling took place on 14 June 1914. Initially, it was placed in the Pavilion of the Association of Silesian Artists at the Centennial Exhibition organized in 1913 around the Centennial Hall. It was moved a year later to its present location.

References

Further reading

Sculptures of Cupid
Pegasus
Neoclassical sculptures
1913 sculptures
Bronze sculptures in Poland
Tourist attractions in Wrocław
1914 in Poland
Outdoor sculptures in Poland